Gregory Louis Timp  is a professor of Electrical Engineering and Biological Sciences at the University of Notre Dame. A graduate of the Massachusetts Institute of Technology, Timp has previously worked at Bell Laboratories and the University of Illinois. He has worked with low temperature transport, nanostructure physics and, since 2000, research at the boundary between biology and nanoelectronics. He is a Fellow of the American Association for the Advancement of Science, the American Physical Society, the Institute of Electrical and Electronics Engineers.

Sources
Professor Gregory Timp, PhD , University of Notre Dame.
Gregory Timp, University of Illinois at Urbana-Champaign

Year of birth missing (living people)
Living people
Massachusetts Institute of Technology alumni
University of Illinois faculty
University of Notre Dame faculty